The 11th Writers Guild of America Awards honored the best film writers of 1958. Winners were announced in 1959.

Winners & Nominees

Film 
Winners are listed first highlighted in boldface.

Special Awards

References

External links 

 WGA.org

1958
W
Writers Guild of America Awards
Writers Guild of America Awards